The 2015/16 FIS Nordic Combined World Cup was the 33rd World Cup season, organized by the International Ski Federation. It started on 4 December 2015 in Lillehammer, Norway and ended on 6 March 2016 in Schonach, Germany.

Calendar

Men

Team

Standings

Overall 

Final standings after 19 events.

Nations Cup 

Final standings after 22 events.

Prize money 

Final standings after 22 events.

Achievements 

First World Cup career victory
 , 24, in his 7th season – the WC 1 in Lillehammer; first podium was 2011–12 in Oberstdorf
 , 18, in his 2nd season – the WC 10 in Oslo, first podium was 2014–15 in Seefeld

First World Cup podium
 , 20, in his 2nd season – no. 3 in the WC 1 in Lillehammer
 , 22, in his 7th season – no. 3 in the WC 4 in Ramsau

Victories in this World Cup (in brackets victory for all time)
 , 8 (31) first places
 , 3 (3) first places
 , 2 (3) first places
 , 2 (3) first places
 , 1 (25) first place
 , 1 (6) first place
 , 1 (6) first place
 , 1 (1) first place

Retirements 

Following are notable nordic combined skiers who announced their retirement:

Footnotes

References 

2015 in Nordic combined
2016 in Nordic combined
FIS Nordic Combined World Cup